Ostro, or Austro, is a southerly wind in the Mediterranean Sea, especially the Adriatic. Its name is Italian, derived from the Latin name Auster, which also meant a southerly wind.  It is a warm and humid wind that often carries rain, but it is also sometimes identified with the Libeccio and Scirocco.

External links

 List of wind names (in German)

Italian words and phrases
Winds
Climate of Malta